Sloppy Seconds Vol. 2 is a mixtape album by the CunninLynguists, released in 2005.

Track listing

"Cornasto"
"WQN5 Station ID #1"
"Play Hard"
"The Party" (Skit)
"What They Playin? (Blow my High)"
"Being Human's Hard"
"Fear"
"Clap"
"WQN5 Station ID #2"
"Wachugondo?"
"Break Even"Featuring Tripp Doogan
"Brain Over Muscle"
"Time (What is It?)"
"Friendgirl"
"Porcelain (Remix)"
"Miss Lady"
"Til' the End (C.A.L.I.)"
"The Talk" (Skit)
"Since When?"
"Mind Won't Behave"
"It's Over"
"Be Free (Remix)"
"W.C.G."
"Diamond Sky"
"WQN5 Station ID #3"
"What'll You Do?"
"Outro"

CunninLynguists albums
2005 mixtape albums
Sequel albums